Niagara Falls is a 1941 American comedy of errors film directed by Gordon Douglas that was one of Hal Roach's Streamliners.

Plot summary
A peanut vendor sights a man named Sam Sawyer attempting suicide by jumping off a cliff into the waters below. The vendor offers a free bag of peanuts to hear Sam's story of what brought him to make such a decision.

Through flashback Sam relates that he and his wife Emily made their way to Niagara Falls for their honeymoon. On the way there Sam and Emily sight a bickering young couple named Tom and Margie who they later see at their hotel. Tom and Margie are two strangers who met through automobile accidents that have destroyed their cars, leaving them furious with each other. Unknown to each other, Tom and Margie hitch rides to the same hotel they both plan to stay at. Once at the hotel Sam sees Tom and Margie arguing and Sam wrongly assumes they are married but having a quarrel. He offers his and Emily's reserved bridal suite to the couple so they can be reconciled.

As the two are not keen on the idea, Sam marches them at gunpoint into the smaller room he and Emily had taken in exchange for the bridal suite, and locks them in. To the distress of Emily, Sam is so keen on bringing the couple together he stays up all night with his large revolver facing their room to prevent escape attempts.

During the night the young couple realise they are in love, and have a minister and a witness, who are hotel guests, marry them. In the morning Sam and the management of the hotel discover that the couple really were not married after all. The female guests of the hotel demand they all be evicted in shame.

The film cuts back to Sam, who concludes the story and says, "Nothing will ever cure me". The peanut vendor says, "I wouldn't say that", and pushes him off the cliff. Sam holds on to a branch stating, "I'm gonna start minding my own business before it's too late". The branch snaps, Sam says, "Too late!" and crashes into the water. It is assumed that he is ok as he treads water.

Cast
 Marjorie Woodworth as Margie Blake
 Tom Brown as Tom Wilson
 ZaSu Pitts as Emmy Sawyer
 Slim Summerville as Sam Sawyer
 Chester Clute as Hotel Manager Potter
 Edgar Dearing as Motorcycle Cop
 Edward Gargan as Chuck
 Gladys Blake as Trixie
 Leon Belasco as Head Waiter
 Charlie Hall as Bellhop
 Rand Brooks as Honeymooner
 Margaret Roach as Honeymooner
 Jack Rice as Hotel Desk Clerk

Notes
ZaSu Pitts and Slim Summerville had made a streamliner prequel Miss Polly playing the same characters. When some cinemas refused to accept double features, Hal Roach combined the two films into one standard length feature with the same title.

External links 
 
 

1941 films
American black-and-white films
Niagara Falls in fiction
1941 romantic comedy films
American romantic comedy films
Hal Roach Studios
Films directed by Gordon Douglas
1940s English-language films
1940s American films